The sport of soccer has a long history in New York City, beginning in the 1910s with the first iteration of the American Soccer League. In the 1970s, with the rise of the first iteration of the North American Soccer League, the New York Cosmos became one of the most recognizable brands in American soccer.

Presently, there are five professional soccer clubs in the New York City region.  New York City FC and the New York Red Bulls play in the top division, Major League Soccer, while their reserve teams New York Red Bulls II and New York City FC II compete in MLS Next Pro, in the third tier. NJ/NY Gotham FC, a women's team, competes in the National Women's Soccer League. New York City FC plays in the Bronx, New York City FC II plays in Queens, and the other three teams play in northern New Jersey.  A USL Championship club, Queensboro FC, has been announced but will not begin play in 2023.

The region has also hosted 27 U.S. Open Cup finals at various venues including Starlight Park, Triborough Stadium, Dexter Park, the Metropolitan Oval, the Polo Grounds and Ebbets Field. Despite this, a New York City-based club has not won the Open Cup since the 1991 final, where the Brooklyn Italians defeated the Richardson Rockets. The last time a local club reached the final was 2003, where the New York Red Bulls, then known as MetroStars''' lost to Chicago Fire.

Today, major stadiums that host soccer matches include Red Bull Arena, Yankee Stadium and MetLife Stadium, which is considered a strong candidate to host the 2026 World Cup Final.

 Professional clubs 

 Amateur clubs 

 Most successful clubs overall 

Teams in italics'' are no longer active.

New York derbies
There are 3 professional New York derbies:
New York Red Bulls vs New York City FC ("Hudson River Derby"): 

New York Red Bulls and New York City FC met for the first time in 2015 at the first inaugural New York derby in MLS

New York Red Bulls vs New York Cosmos 
New York Red Bulls and New York Cosmos met for the first time in 2014 Lamar Hunt U.S. Open Cup

New York City FC vs New York Cosmos ("East River Derby")
New York City FC and New York Cosmos met for the first time in 2015 Lamar Hunt U.S. Open Cup

See also 
 Soccer in the United States
 Soccer in Houston
 Soccer in Los Angeles
 History of professional soccer in Seattle

References

External links
 Article on soccer in New York

 

New York City